The Sims FreePlay is a strategic life simulation game developed by EA Mobile and later with Firemonkeys Studios. It is a freemium version of The Sims for mobile devices; it was released for iOS on December 15, 2011, released for Android on February 15, 2012, released for BlackBerry 10 on July 31, 2013, and released for Windows Phone 8 on September 12, 2013.

Gameplay
In The Sims FreePlay, players "build" and design houses and customize and create (a maximum of 34) virtual people called Sims. Players can control their Sims to satisfy their wishes, and let them complete different kinds of actions to gain Simoleons, Lifestyle Points, and Social Points (all three currencies in the game). The game runs in real-time, and takes real time to complete actions. All actions must be instructed by players, unlike in the Windows version, where Sims have some degree of autonomy. Players can progress through 55 levels to unlock content (such as furniture for the Sims’ houses) that can be purchased with the virtual currencies previously mentioned. Families of Sims can have children provided there is one adult Sim; there is a limit on the amount of allowable couples due to a limit on the people in the player's town. However, if the player buys items from the online store, they become a VIP that will allow them to increase the number of Sims they can have in their town. In the game, there are "quests" that players are required to complete as well as optional quests ("discovery quests") that they may choose to pursue. Sims must bake a cake to age until completion of a certain quota of discovery quests.

Currency 
The game features three types of currency: Simoleons, Lifestyle Points, and Social Points, the latter being obtainable by spending real currency or earning it in-game.

Life Stages 
There are six life stages and they differ from each other both in terms of the graphic aspect of the Sim and the actions it can perform. Each Sim can advance in stage (therefore in age) via a birthday cake, an item that is obtained for the price of five life points after a day of work on a Sim in the oven. The various characteristics for each stage are these:

 Infant: To give birth to an infant Sim, just buy a crib from the catalog, use it, and pay a price of 3 Lifestyle Points or a set price in Simoleons (if you have already finished the Life Dreams and Legacies quest, or if it's your first infant Sim). After that is done, you need to wait 24 hours for the stork for the birth of the infant Sim. Then, with an update, released in early summer 2018, a pregnant Sim can now become incitement, in 2 different ways: The first lasts 6 human days, and is the most expensive. During this time, the pregnant Sim's belly grows until delivery at the end of the 6 days. Then the second, cheaper option, lasts 9 days and you can carry out various actions that at the birth of the infant Sim will give them a life bonus that will give them various enhancements (their needs are lowered more slowly, they finish the actions earlier, etc.) up to their death. Once the wait is over, the player can customize the infant Sim's appearance, name, skin colour, etc. Infant Sims can only interact with teen Sims, adult Sims, senior Sims, and some pets.
 Toddler: Toddler Sims can do many things, such as walking, talking, going to the toilet, going to bed alone, riding toy horses and more. They cannot eat alone and therefore need an adult Sim to give them food, unless using a dish cooked by an adult Sim. They also need the help of an adult Sim to wash themselves. They can also interact with another toddler Sims, preteen Sims, teen Sims, and senior Sims.
 Preteen: Preteen Sims can start pursuing hobbies like ballet and karate, go to SimTown elementary school, and learn to read and write accordingly. At this age they can wash themselves and eat alone, but they cannot cook.
 Teen: The ability to become a teen Sim was introduced with an update released in November 2013, along with the ability to build the SimTown high school. Teen Sims can have romantic relationships and become "teen idol Sims". They can also start using the stove and toaster for cooking.
 Adult: The main state of the game. An adult Sim has the ability to work, build homes, and start a family. This is the only case in which it is possible to create a Sim without cost, it is enough to have a free house to be able to create a new adult Sim.
 Senior: If adult Sims use a birthday cake they will become senior Sims. Senior Sims can have new hobbies, play bingo, and have new animals, such as birds.

House customization 
A limited number of houses can be built depending on the player's level and in any case not exceeding that of empty land on the city map. The player can build a house starting from standard blueprints that include houses to be furnished (lower price) or already furnished (higher price) or from special architect projects, also can start from extra game projects if unlocked in one of the various quests.

The furniture of each house is customizable by the player by buying objects from the catalog that concern both the exteriors and the interiors, moving the various objects (including doors) in the rooms. There is also the possibility of moving objects between different houses via the player's inventory. There are standard furniture items that are unlocked as the player progresses and special items that can be obtained through special quests or bought during special offers in the catalog.

Events 
In the game occasionally, SimChase is a television reality show hosted by a Sim named Kam Ham. Each episode consists of tasks to complete to beat a rival. Failing to beat the tasks within 24 hours of the episode beginning will make your sim lose out on the prize for that series of tasks. If the player can't complete an episode before the time runs out, they can choose to skip it with Social Points. If prizes are missed, and the SimChase season ends, the rival will sell some cheaper prizes for Social Points. By completing episodes before the rival completes them, players can win furniture and cosmetic items, as well as "Chase Tokens", which are used in the Roadworks Spin, which can give the player boosts such as:

 Roadblocks, which add an extra 30 minutes of time to complete the current episode
 Mega Roadblocks, which add an extra 60 minutes of time to complete the current episode
 Mastery Discounts, which reduce the cost of the Mastery Challenge in the current episode
 Snail's Pace, which makes the rival's current Challenge take double the time it usually would take.

Updates 
As of April 2017, Windows Phones no longer receive updates from the game.

In June 2018, pregnancy and baby showers were added to the game. People said that fans requested the feature be added to the game ever since FreePlay launched. Before this update, adult Sims had to marry for an option to be given to add an infant Sim to the family.

On October 15, 2018, augmented reality multiplayer was added.

In July 2019, the autosave function was added.

List of updates 

The following is a list of The Sims FreePlay updates:

2023 
 Charming Cottage Update (January 2023)

2022 
 FreeplayFest Update (December 2022)
 Faces of the Future Update (October 2022)
 Falling for Fall Update (September 2022)
 Hot Simmerin' Summer Update (July 2022)
 You DOT You Update (June 2022)
 Shabby Chic Update (May 2022)
 Tutti Frutti Update (March 2022)
 Mariachi Romance Update (January 2022)

2021 
 Party of the Decade Update (November 2021)
 Mysterious Masquerade Update (October 2021)
 Maximalist Safari Update (September 2021)
 Joyous Japan Update (July 2021)
 Coastal Living Update (June 2021)
 Palm Perfection Update (May 2021)
 Lofty Lifestyle Update (March 2021)
 Rustic Wedding & Art Deco Update (February 2021)
 Magical Morocco Update (January 2021)

2020 
 Christmas In London Update (December 2020)
 Thanksgiving Update (November 2020)
 Share Your Care Update (October 2020)
 School's Out Update (August 2020)
 Family Fun Update (July 2020)
 Eco Lifestyle Update (June 2020)
 Holiday Français Update (April 2020)
 Desert Oasis Update (March 2020)
 Romantic Garden Update (February 2020)
 Glam Mansion Update (January 2020)

2019 
 Lakeside Christmas Update (December 2019)
 Cafe Culture Update (October 2019)
 Fine Dining Update (September 2019)
 Family Furnishings Update (July 2019)
 Pool Paradise Update (April 2019)
 Grand Garages Update (March 2019)
 Refined Romance Update (January 2019)

2018 
 Holiday 2018 Update (December 2018)
 Brilliant Backyard Update (October 2018)
 Luxury Living Update (August 2018)
 Chic Boutique Update (July 2018)
 Pregnancy Update (June 2018)
 Kids Party Update (April 2018)
 Home Makeover Update (March 2018)                
 Love And Treasure Update (February 2018)

2017 
 Holiday 2017 Update (December 2017)
 Halloween 2017 Update (October 2017)
 Downtown High School Update (August 2017)
 Penthouse Update (June 2017)
 Dance Party Update (May 2017)
 Day Care Update (April 2017)
 French Romance Update (January 2017)

2016 
 Holiday 2016 Update (December 2016)
 Halloween 2016 Update (October 2016)
 Doctor Update (September 2016)
 Movie Star Update (July 2016)
 Police Update (June 2016)
 Spa Update (May 2016)
 Easter 2016 Update (March 2016)
 Romance Update (February 2016)

2015 
 Holiday 2015 Update (December 2015)
 Monsters & Magic Update (October 2015)
 Glitz & Glam Update (September 2015)
 Baby Steps Update (July 2015)
 Great Outdoors Update (June 2015)
 DIY Update (April 2015)
 Royalty Update (March 2015)                        
 Sunset Mall Update (January 2015)

2014 
 Holiday 2014 Update (December 2014)
 Wizards & Witches Update (October 2014)
 Barkshire Pet Park Update (September 2014)
 Let's Eat Update (August 2014)
 Carnival Update (June 2014) 
 Saddle Up Update (May 2014)
 Life Dreams & Legacies Update (March 2014)
 All Grown Up Update (January 2014)

2013 
 Holiday 2013 Update (December 2013)
 Teens Update (October 2013)
 Mystery Island Update (September 2013)
 Neighbors Update (July 2013)
 Climate Control Update (June 2013)
 Moving Up Update  (April 2013)
 Living Large Update (March 2013)
 Pool Party Update (February 2013)

2012 
 Holiday 2012 Update (December 2012)
 Supernatural Update (October 2012)
 Preteens Update (September 2012)
 Salon Update (August 2012)
 Social Update (June 2012)
 Toddlers Update (May 2012)
 Easter 2012 Update (April 2012)
 Marriage & Babies Update (March 2012)
 Valentine's Day Update (February 2012)

Reception 
The Sims Freeplay received "Generally favorable reviews" from critics, holding an aggregated Metacritic score of 80/100.

Gamezebo site called FreePlay more than just a social app, but a beautiful reimagining of The Sims 3. Nissa Campbell of TouchArcade believes that FreePlay is very similar in spirit to the original The Sims of 2000 and seems to be listening to the claims left back in those days - to add MMORPG elements to its gameplay. AppGamer also noted that the timing mechanic makes the player either love Freeplay or hate it, especially for those who don't like to wait for hours. Everyeye.it  called the timing mechanics the worst decision in this game.

Censorship 
The video game was banned in China, Saudi Arabia, United Arab Emirates, Oman, Kuwait, Qatar and Egypt due to the possibility of establishing a homosexual relationship.

See also
The Sims Mobile

References

External links
 The Sims FreePlay on Facebook

2011 video games
Android (operating system) games
BlackBerry 10 games
Free-to-play video games
God games
IOS games
Life simulation games
FreePlay
Video games developed in Australia
Video games developed in the United States
WebOS games
Windows Phone games